Chris Henry (born 17 October 1984) is a former Irish rugby union rugby player. He played for Ulster and Ballymena Rugby Club.

He was educated at the Wallace High School in Lisburn before going to Queen's University Belfast.
In November 2009, he was named in Ireland's 39-man squad for the 2009 end of year rugby tests and again in  the squad for the 2010 mid-year rugby test series when he received his first cap vs Australia.

In November 2014, Henry suffered a temporary blockage of a small blood vessel in his brain before Ireland were due to play South Africa in the end-of-year international series.

Honours

Ireland A
Churchill Cup:
Winner (1): 2009

Ireland
Six Nations Championship: 2014

References

External links
Ulster profile

1984 births
Living people
Irish rugby union players
Ulster Rugby players
Ballymena R.F.C. players
Ireland international rugby union players
People educated at Wallace High School, Lisburn
Alumni of Queen's University Belfast
Ireland Wolfhounds international rugby union players
Rugby union players from Belfast